Charles Frederick Huth (1806–1895) was a British merchant banker, and art collector. He was a partner in Frederick Huth & Co, the bank founded by his father, Frederick Huth.

Early life
Charles Frederick Huth was born on 7 November 1806 at Corunna, Spain.

Career
Huth was an art collector, especially of British watercolours, including J. M. W. Turner, and his collection was sold at Christie's on 19 March 1904.

Personal life
In 1836, Huth married Frances Caroline Marshall (1812–1901), the daughter of Sir Chapman Marshall and Anne Stansfield, and they lived at Tunbridge Wells, Kent, in later life.

They had ten children together:
Frederick Huth (1837–1848)
Alexander Huth (1838–1914)
Ferdinand Marshall Huth (1840–1903)
Caroline Anne Huth (1842–1911)
Frederick Henry Huth (1844–1918)
Fanny Gertrude Huth (1846–1915)
Marian Huth (1847–1876)
Octavia Huth (1849–1929), married her first cousin, Alfred Henry Huth (1850–1910), the bibliophile
Percival Huth (1851–1913)
Reginald Huth (1853–1926)

References

1806 births
1895 deaths
Charles